Toby Leung Ching-kei (Chinese: 梁靖琪, born 27 February 1983) is Cantopop singer and actress from Hong Kong.  She entered the music industry in 2004 when the MusicNationGroup discovered her talent. Together with Macy Chan, Elise Liu (廖雋嘉) and Bella Cheung (張曼伶), they formed the singing group Girl's only Dormitory (女生宿舍) which eventually disbanded. Her father, Tommy Leung, was also the deputy-chief director of drama in TVB (and now with ViuTV), which allowed her to enter the acting career. She signed with TVB and became a contracted artist for 12 years until 2016 where she joined ViuTV.

Filmography

Television

Films

Discography
Life is Beautiful (2004)
Bear in Mind (2005)

Personal life
Leung has Canadian nationality in addition to Hong Kong citizenship. She went to King George V School in Hong Kong for secondary education. She married Aaron Wong on 24 November 2011 and officially divorced in 2014. In 2019, Leung married to Johnathan Sze and had a baby in December named Roman Sze. In late 2021, she announced her second pregnancy on social media.

Awards
2005年度新城勁爆頒獎禮 – 勁爆新登場女歌手
2005年度RoadShow至尊音樂頒獎禮 – 至尊潛力新人
第二十七屆十大中文金曲頒獎禮 – 最有前途新人獎（組合）銅獎
新城勁爆頒獎禮2004 – 勁爆新人王（組合）
勁歌金曲2004優秀選第二回 – 新星試打
Yahoo!搜尋人氣大獎2004 – 演藝新力軍組別
廣州電台2004年金曲金榜頒獎晚會 – 港台金曲獎「全女打」，新登場女組合大獎
PM第三屆樂壇頒獎禮 – PM火熱概念組合新人獎
PM第三屆人氣歌手奪標頒獎禮 – PM新進閃爍女子組合
2004年音樂先鋒榜 – 廣東最受歡迎女子組合獎金獎

References

External links
Official Sina Blog of Toby Leung 
Official Yahoo! Blog of Toby Leung
Toby Leung on Sina Weibo

1983 births
Living people
Cantopop singers
TVB actors
21st-century Hong Kong women singers
Hong Kong businesspeople
Canadian actresses of Hong Kong descent
Actresses from Vancouver
21st-century Hong Kong actresses
21st-century Canadian actresses
Hong Kong television actresses
Alumni of King George V School, Hong Kong